Ma Ho-ling (9 November 1920 – 1 November 2005) was a high official of Kuomintang and the Republic of China. He was the father of Ma Ying-jeou, the former President of the Republic of China.

Biography
Ma was born in Xiangtan, Hunan in 1920. He graduated from Central Political School in Nanking (the predecessor of National Chengchi University in Taiwan).

While he lived in Hong Kong, he started an open-air Cha chaan teng in Lai Chi Kok Amusement Park.  At that time, he then used three hundred dollars to hire his future wife, Qin Houxiu.

He married Qin Houxiu (1922-2013) in 1943 and then came to Taiwan in 1948. The couple had four daughters and one son. The fourth child and the only son is Ma Ying-jeou.

Ma was a Director at Youth Supervision Committee of the Executive Yuan and Vice Chairman of Performance Committee of Kuomintang.

Ma Ho-ling had a strong influence on his son Ma Ying-jeou. In an interview in 2004, he said that he wanted his son to run for president. But in 2005, he strongly opposed his son to run for Kuomintang's Chairmanship and even threatened to commit suicide if Ma Ying-jeou would not give up his candidacy.

Ma Ho-ling died of a heart attack in 2005. The inscription upon his urn said: "Fade independence into gradual unification, wholly revitalize china; assist the strong and lift the weak, work together towards utopia." When this inscription was disclosed, President Chen Shui-bian took advantage of it as evidence that Ma Ying-jeou did not love Taiwan.

During the 2008 presidential elections, Chuang Kuo-jung, an official of the Ministry of Education, accused Ma Ho-ling of having affairs with various women. After arousing public anger, Chuang apologized and stepped down from his post.

References

1920 births
2005 deaths
Politicians from Xiangtan
Politicians of Taiwan
Republic of China politicians from Hunan
Taiwanese people from Hunan